The 1878 Middlesex by-election was held on 12 April 1878, due to the incumbent Conservative MP, Lord George Hamilton, becoming Vice-President of the Committee of the Council on Education.  It was retained by the incumbent unopposed.

References

Middlesex by-election
Middlesex by-election
19th century in Middlesex
Middlesex by-election
Middlesex,1878
Ministerial by-elections to the Parliament of the United Kingdom
Middlesex,1878
Unopposed by-elections to the Parliament of the United Kingdom in English constituencies